Lara Arruabarrena and Renata Voráčová were the defending champions having won the previous edition in 2019, but chose not to participate.

Irina Bara and Ekaterine Gorgodze won the title, defeating Katarzyna Piter and Mayar Sherif in the final, 6–3, 2–6, [10–7].

Seeds

Draw

Draw

References

External Links
Main Draw

Karlsruhe Open - Doubles